is the second single of the subgroup Tanpopo. It was released on March 10, 1999, as an 8 cm CD and reached number seven on the Japan Oricon charts. A remix version of this song was made and was featured on the group's first album, Tanpopo 1.

Track listing 
The lyricist and composer of the songs is Tsunku. "Motto" was arranged by Shin Kohno, while Takao Konishi arranged the b-side song.
 "Motto"
 
 "Motto (Instrumental)"

Members at the time of single 
 Aya Ishiguro (石黒彩)
 Kaori Iida (飯田圭織)
 Mari Yaguchi (矢口真里)

Musical Personnel

Motto 
 Aya Ishiguro - vocals
 Kaori Iida - vocals
 Mari Yaguchi - vocals
 Hiram Bullock - guitar
 Sean C - turntable
 Bashiri Johnson - percussion
 Shin Kohno (河野伸) - keyboards/arranger
 Will Lee - bass
 Chris Parker - drums
 Tsunku - additional vocals

Ai no Uta 
 Aya Ishiguro - vocals
 Kaori Iida - vocals
 Mari Yaguchi - vocals
 Go Katsuura (勝浦剛) - manipulator
  - keyboards/arranger
 Susumu Nishikawa (西川進) - guitar
  - Wurlitzer

External links 
 Motto entry at Hello! Project Official Website (Archived)
 Motto Up-Front Works
 Projecthello.com: Motto lyrics, Ai no Uta lyrics

Tanpopo songs
Torch songs
1999 singles
Japanese-language songs
Songs written by Tsunku
Song recordings produced by Tsunku
1999 songs
Zetima Records singles